The 2020–21 season was Al-Shorta's 47th season in the Iraqi Premier League, having featured in all 46 previous editions of the competition. Al-Shorta participated in the Iraqi Premier League, the Iraq FA Cup and the AFC Champions League, having won the league title in the 2018–19 season (the 2019–20 league season was abandoned due to the COVID-19 pandemic). Al-Shorta were unable to defend their league title as they ended the season in fourth place, while they reached the semi-finals of the Iraq FA Cup and were eliminated from the AFC Champions League group stages.

Squad
Numbers in parenthesis denote appearances as substitute.

Personnel

Technical staff

Management

Kit
Supplier: Qithara (club's own brand)

Transfers

In

Out

Competitions

Iraqi Premier League

Iraq FA Cup

2020 AFC Champions League

Group stage
Al-Shorta's first two group stage games were played in the 2019–20 season before the tournament was postponed due to the COVID-19 pandemic.

2021 AFC Champions League

Group stage

References

External links
Al-Shorta website
Al-Shorta TV
Team info at goalzz.com

Al-Shorta SC seasons